The 2018–19 season seen the club's return to the Scottish Championship after being relegated from the Scottish Premiership, the top flight of Scottish football. On 26 April 2019 however, they were crowned Champions and made an immediate return to the Premiership.

Ross County also be competed in the League Cup, the Scottish Cup and the Scottish Challenge Cup. They won the Challenge Cup beating Connah's Quay Nomads in the final.

Results & fixtures

Pre-season
*Note: Games played on the same day and same time are played with two different squads led by two different managers. Fixtures are being played on the same day as to avoid preseason friendlies leaking into time taken up by the League Cup Group Stage.

Scottish Championship

Scottish League Cup

Matches

Scottish Challenge Cup

Scottish Cup

Squad statistics

Appearances
As of 4 May 2019

|-
|colspan="10"|Players who left the club during the season
|-

|-
|}

Team statistics

League table

League Cup table

Transfers

In

Out

See also
 List of Ross County F.C. seasons

Notes and references

2018-19
Ross County